Time's Up! Environmental Organization was founded in 1987 to help educate New Yorkers about environmental awareness. One of its main focuses is to promote non-polluting transportation, by advocating bicycling. 

Time's Up! helped found New York City's Pedicab industry and took a role in maintaining community gardens in New York City. 

More recent initiatives include support for the Occupy Wall Street movement and the Museum of Reclaimed Urban Space. Time's Up! is run by volunteers, with over 150 in 2012. Time's Up! also had a video documentary team. Dr. Michael Nash, the director of Tamiment Library, wrote: “Time's Up has been at the center of a new generation of activist politics in New York."

History

Early years
Time's Up! Environmental Group was founded in New York City in 1987. Since 1991, Time's Up! has been campaigning to promote hybrid vehicles, pedal-assist technologies, and advocacy of biking. Time's Up! formerly held a moonlight ride in Central Park to raise environmental awareness. These group bike rides created a safe place for people to cycle together because it is an auto-free ride.  

In 1992, Time's Up! assisted with Green Apple Map, which pinpointed 145 sites in New York City that have made an environmental impact and have sparked a local-global movement. Time's Up! launched a campaign to reclaim public space from automobiles, including a traffic-calming ride in Central Park, advocating auto-free streets, and encouraging sustainable infrastructure.

In 1994, Time's Up! volunteers, working with the Hub Station, founded the Pedicab industry in New York City. Pedicabs operate similarly to a taxi in that they pick up passengers, though without the pollution associated with motorized taxis. In 1994, mostly in pieces, 12 pedicabs were brought into NYC with the idea of test marketing them. George Bliss, from the Hub Station, was one of the early pioneers of this project, working with Time's Up! volunteers and a donated space by Light Wheels on Crosby Street, NYC. At the Crosby Street space, Time's Up! began to put together the pedicabs, and started introducing them to the streets. Pedicabs have struggled to build up their presence in New York, especially when the city installed roadblocks and tried to put a cap on them.

  Pedicabs prevailed, and they became plentiful.  In 1996, Time's Up! worked with the Wetlands Activism Collective on their awareness campaign. Time's Up! started the Street Memorial Project beginning in 1996. This project commemorated cyclists and pedestrians killed by motorists while raising awareness of unsafe local infrastructure. 

In 1999, Time's Up! teamed up with a coalition to cultivate some community gardens and protect endangered ones. This project also created dozens of new gardens with Time's Up! volunteers and community support. Time's Up! is a part of many other community garden cleanups as well.

2000s and beyond
In 2004, Time's Up! hosted the Bike National Convention. Also in 2004, Time's Up! helped launch a bicycle co-op in downtown Manhattan in space donated by Steve Stollman. The co-op offered workshops 5 nights a week showing riders how to repair their bicycles in a skilled share format. This indoor space also housed a video-editing studio, puppet/prop making, offices, weekly educational movie nights, and eco-seminars.

In 2005, Time's Up teamed up with Visual Resistance to begin the white Ghost Bike Project. Ghost bikes are memorials placed at sites of crashes involving bicycles. In 2006, Time's Up! campaigned in defense of New Yorkers' First Amendment Rights. Part of these rights is the freedom of speech and public assembly. Included in that are the rights to protect bicyclists riding together in a group and the growth of the pedicab movement. Time's Up's first amendment lawyer, Norman Siegel, the NYC Bar association, and the National Lawyers Guild helped with this campaign.

In 2008, Time's Up! opened its Manhattan space, located at ABC NoRio community center on 156 Rivington Street. The Brooklyn space on 99 South 6th Street opened in 2010. 

In 2011, Times Up! stepped up their efforts on education and direct action towards renewable energy by pointing out the harmful effects of fossil fuels and nonrenewable energy sources. They began a partnership with Viridian Energy, a wind power company. They campaigned against nuclear power. In one campaign, they worked with Clearwater Environmental Organizations to focus on shutting down the Indian Point power plant. Later in the year, Times Up! at the Brooklyn location created its own mechanical energy using energy bikes. Volunteers designed these bikes to generate electricity. Also in 2011, Times Up! helped create educational materials on environmental issues as part of the Occupy Wall Street movement. As the movement continued, people living in Zuccotti Park needed their bikes to be repaired. Time's Up! brought tools and parts to hold free fix-your-bike workshops. 

One of Time's Up's events is the annual Occupy Fountain Ride. The fourth annual ride was held in 2012. Time's Up! utilizes privately owned public spaces such as Zuccotti Park that contain fountains by swimming in them.

In 2012, Time's Up! helped launch a museum in New York City's Lower East Side called the Museum of Reclaimed Urban Space (MoRUS). MoRUS is a living archive of the Lower East Side's squats and community gardens. It will display photographs, posters, underground newspapers etc. to show how local residents cleaned up vacant lots and buildings and created organized spaces for the community. The museum's tentative opening date is late July 2012. 
Time's Up! is helping fundraise for the museum by spreading the word through documenting the construction process. Also in 2012, Time's Up introduced the 1000 Dutch-Style Bike Program, refurbishing used city-friendly bicycles to promote environmentally friendly transportation.

References

External links

Time's Up! Records at Tamiment Library and Robert F. Wagner Labor Archives at New York University

Cycling in New York City
DIY culture
Environmental organizations based in New York City
Organizations based in New York City